Jonathan "Jonny" Gustafson (born March 5, 1997) is an American luger who competes internationally.

He represented his country in the mens' singles event at the 2022 Winter Olympics where placed 190th.

References

External links
 
 
 
 

1997 births
Living people
American male lugers
Olympic lugers of the United States
Lugers at the 2022 Winter Olympics
People from Lake Placid, New York